William Beck Ochiltree (October 18, 1811 – December 27, 1867), was a settler, judge, and legislator in Texas. In 1963, Recorded Texas Historic Landmark Number 967, honoring Colonel Ochiltree, was placed at the courthouse in Perryton.

Biography
He was born in Fayetteville, North Carolina; his family lived for a time in Florida and after 1820 in Alabama, where Ochiltree began practicing law. In 1839 he moved to Nacogdoches, Texas, and continued his practice. During the years of the Republic of Texas, he was a judge of the Fifth Judicial District, secretary of the treasury in 1844, adjutant general in 1845, and delegate to the Convention of 1845. 

After the annexation of Texas by the United States, he was a representative in the Sixth Texas Legislature in 1855 and delegate to the Secession Convention in 1861. He was elected to the Provisional Congress of the Confederate States but resigned after a short time to return to Texas and raise a regiment.  

Poor health forced him to resign that post in 1863. He subsequently lived at Jefferson until his death.

References

External links
 
 Read William B. Ochiltree's entry in the Biographical Encyclopedia of Texas hosted by the Portal to Texas History.

1811 births
1867 deaths
19th-century American politicians
Deputies and delegates to the Provisional Congress of the Confederate States
Members of the Texas House of Representatives
Ochiltree County, Texas
Politicians from Fayetteville, North Carolina
People from Nacogdoches, Texas
People of Texas in the American Civil War
Recorded Texas Historic Landmarks
Signers of the Confederate States Constitution
Signers of the Provisional Constitution of the Confederate States
Justices of the Republic of Texas Supreme Court
People from Jefferson, Texas
19th-century American judges